The Tiger Hunt is a large painting by Peter Paul Rubens, featuring a hunt for a tiger. It dates to between 1615 and 1616 and is one of the four hunting paintings, commissioned by Maximilian I, Elector of Bavaria to decorate the old Schleissheim Palace. The cycle was seized during the Napoleonic Wars and this painting is now in Musée des Beaux-Arts de Rennes.

It has been used in 2018 as a piece of staging in promotional materials for the HBO series Succession.

References

Related subjects by Rubens

Paintings by Peter Paul Rubens
1616 paintings
Horses in art
Tigers in art
Paintings in the collection of the Museum of Fine Arts of Rennes
Hunting in art
Paintings about death